The Color Before the Sun is the eighth studio album by progressive rock band Coheed and Cambria. Following the conceptual double album, The Afterman: Ascension and Descension, released in 2012 and 2013 respectively, The Color Before the Sun is the first non-conceptual album the band has released, making it the only Coheed and Cambria album to not be a part of The Amory Wars storyline. The band released a live acoustic version of "Atlas" in August 2014, and announced a release date of October 9 in July of the following year, before announcing a push back to October 16, 2015. The first single was "You Got Spirit, Kid", released in July 2015, with a music video for the song released in August. A second music video, for the song "Island", was released in October.

Background and recording
In August 2014, Coheed and Cambria singer/guitarist Claudio Sanchez released a self-shot acoustic rendition of a new song titled "Atlas" via the band's official YouTube channel.

Musical style
Journalists characterized the album’s sound in a number of ways. AllMusic, in describing the album’s songs, stated that “some are fueled by catchy hard rock/pop-punk hooks with anthemic choruses, while others offer knotty, dissonant angles and breathtaking instrumental interplay.” Pop Matters noted similarities with the band's prior work, stating that "Even without a conceptual story, The Color Before the Sun feature[s] a lot of the same musical elements that have made the long-running prog-rock band so enduring: big riffs, bigger choruses, intricate guitar interplay, and strong vocals from frontman-songwriter-guitarist Claudio Sanchez".  According to Darryl Sterdan of Toronto Sun, "The Color Before the Sun" abandons the band's previous progressive rock sound, in favor of a "more grounded and streamlined" alternative rock sound. Richard Whittaker at The Austin Chronicle characterized the album as "pop rock rather than space prog."

Release

The album was released in both digital and physical formats on October 16, 2015. The album name and release date were announced on July 7, 2015 via social media and the release of a new single, "You Got Spirit, Kid", available to stream. A second single, "Here to Mars" was released on September 3, 2015. On August 6, 2015 a limited edition, deluxe box set was announced. This deluxe box set includes two CDs—the album and a disc of demo tracks—two hardcover books—one featuring album lyrics and artwork and another featuring a "behind-the-scenes look" of the album's creative process—an in-studio DVD, and a clear 7-inch record of unreleased demo tracks. Purchasers also received an instant download of “You Got Spirit, Kid,” a membership card, a custom house key, a lapel pin, a certificate of authenticity; as well as exclusive, members-only access to new music, videos, concert tickets, merchandise and commentary from the band. The week of the release, the band streamed the entire album on the Pandora radio site.

Reception

At Metacritic, The Color Before the Sun generated a score of 70/100 from nine reviews, indicating "Generally favorable reviews".

Tom Jurek at AllMusic stated "The Color Before the Sun is not the band's best record, but it is utterly inspired and almost nakedly sincere. It will likely play well to fans, but even more importantly, perhaps attract new ones." Sean Barry of Consequence of Sound opined "this sort of autobiographical songwriting can’t be found in the band’s foundation." Despite that, Barry stated that "this new freedom and genuine self-acceptance" should be encouraged by the band and expanded upon in future material. Jordan Blum from PopMatters concluded that it's a good album in its own right, and that fans will find things to enjoy about the album, adding "It may sound silly to fault an album for not doing what it was never meant to do, but the lack of an epic scope and a more seamless sequence ... surely makes The Color Before the Sun feel less significant and magnificent than many of its predecessors."

The album was included at number 29 on Rock Sounds top 50 releases of 2015 list.

Track listing
All songs written by Claudio Sanchez. All songs arranged by Coheed and Cambria, all segues arranged by Sanchez.

Personnel

Coheed and Cambria
Claudio Sanchez – lead vocals, rhythm guitar
Travis Stever – lead guitar, backing vocals
Josh Eppard – drums, percussion, backing vocals
Zach Cooper – bass, backing vocals

Additional instrumentation
Roy Agee – horns
Mike Haynes – horns
Jennifer Kummer – horns
Avery Bright – strings
Melodie Morris – strings
Eleonore Denig – strings
Jay Joyce – Rhodes piano
Chondra Marie Sanchez – additional background vocals
The Prize Fighter Inferno – synth world

Artwork
Nick Steinhardt – cover art

Charts

References 
 Citations

Sources

 

2015 albums
Coheed and Cambria albums
Pop rock albums by American artists